Al Oeming – Man of the North was a Canadian nature documentary television series which aired on CBC Television in 1980 which was hosted by conservationist Al Oeming.

Premise
Al Oeming (1925–2014), a wildlife conservationist and zoologist of the Alberta Game Farm, hosted this series with Leslie Nielsen. The series follows Oeming from the prairies to the high arctic as he tries to trap rare animals and endangered species for preservation at his Alberta Game Farm.

Production
The series was produced by Nielsen-Ferns and Jack Kaufman, Ltd.

Scheduling
The 13-episode half-hour series aired on Saturdays at 7:00 p.m. (Eastern) from 29 March to 26 April 1980.

References

External links
 
 

CBC Television original programming
1980 Canadian television series debuts
1980 Canadian television series endings
1980s Canadian documentary television series